The 2015–16 Bosnia and Herzegovina Football Cup was the twentieth season of Bosnia and Herzegovina's annual football cup, and a sixteenth season of the unified competition. The winner qualified to the first qualifying round of the 2016–17 UEFA Europa League.

Olimpic Sarajevo is the title holder, having won their first national cup title previous season.

Qualification
32 teams take part in the Cup. Berths allocation is shown below:
16 teams from the Premier League of Bosnia and Herzegovina,
10 teams from Federation of Bosnia and Herzegovina Cup,
6 teams from the Republika Srpska Cup.

Participating teams
Following teams will take part in 2015–16 Bosnia and Herzegovina Football Cup.

Roman number in brackets denote the level of respective league in Bosnian football league system

Calendar

First round
This round consisted of 16 single-legged fixtures. All 32 clubs entered the competition from this round, while the matches were scheduled for 23 September 2015, with three match on 22 September. In a case of a draw in the regular time, the winner was determined with a penalty shootout.

Second round
The 16 winners continued their way to the final through this round. Unlike the last round, this round consisted of 8 two-legged fixtures. The dates for the matches were determined with the draw which was held on 15 October, while the matches took place on 21 October (first legs) and 4 November 2015 (second legs).

Quarter final
Played on 9 and 15 March 2016; over two legs

Semi final
Played on 13 and 20 April 2016; over two legs.

Final
The final is played over 2 legs. The first match has been played on 11 May 2016, the second one will be played on 18 May 2016.

First leg

Second leg 

Radnik Bijeljina won 4–1 in aggregate.

References

External links
Football Federation of Bosnia and Herzegovina
SportSport.ba

Bosnia and Herzegovina Football Cup seasons
cup
Bosnia